Martin Anthamatten  (born 12 September 1984) is a Swiss ski mountaineer and mountain runner.

Anthamatten was born in Zermatt. He played ice hockey for National League B until 2005, and has been member of the national ski mountaineering team since 2007.

Selected results

Ski mountaineering 
 2007:
 1st and course record, Zermatt-Rothorn mountain race
 1st, Swiss Championship "juniors" class, Grindelwald
 2008:
 2nd, World Championship relay race (together with Pierre Bruchez, Florent Troillet and Didier Moret)
 8th, World Cup race, Val d'Aran
 2009:
 1st, Zermatt-Rothorn run
 2010:
 2nd, World Championship team race (together with Florent Troillet)
 2nd, World Championship relay race (together with Florent Troillet, Yannick Ecoeur and Pierre Bruchez)
 10th, World Championship combination ranking
 3rd, Trophée des Gastlosen (ISMF World Cup), together with Florent Troillet
 2011:
 1st, World Championship sprint
 2nd, World Championship relay, together with Yannick Ecoeur, Marcel Theux and Marcel Marti
 10th, World Championship vertical race
 2012:
 1st, European Championship relay, together with Marcel Theux, Yannick Ecoeur and Alan Tissières
 2nd, World Championship vertical, combined ranking
 3rd, European Championship single
 3rd, European Championship vertical race
 3rd, European Championship team, together with Yannick Ecoeur
 2nd, Patrouille de la Maya, together with Florent TroilleT and Yannick Ecoeur

Patrouille des Glaciers 

 2008: 3rd, together with Ernest Farquet and Jon Andri Willy
 2010: 1st, together with Yannick Ecoeur and Florent Troillet

Trofeo Mezzalama 

 2009: 6th, together with Marcel Marti and Yannick Ecoeur
 2011: 5th, together with Marcel Marti and Yannick Ecoeur

Pierra Menta 

 2010: 5th, together with Yannick Ecoeur
 2011: 4th, together with William Bon Mardion

Running 
 2006:
 2nd, Jeizibärg-Lauf & Dérupe Vercorin Trophy
 2009:
 1st, Jeizibärg-Lauf / Upper Valais Running Cup / Valais Mountain Running Cup, Gampel
 2010:
 2nd, Jeizibärg-Lauf / Mountain Running Cup, Gampel
 2011:
 1st, Jeizibärg-Lauf, Gampel
 1st (men I), Täschalplauf / Upper Valais Running Cup, Täsch
 3rd (M20), Matterhorn run

References

External links 
 Martin Anthamatten at skimountaineering.org

1984 births
Living people
Swiss male ski mountaineers
Swiss male long-distance runners
Swiss ice hockey players
Swiss mountain runners
People from Zermatt
Swiss sky runners
Sportspeople from Valais